Kuttettan is a 1990 Malayalam romantic comedy movie, directed by Joshiy and written by A. K. Lohithadas.  The film stars Mammootty, Saritha, Urvashi, Lizy, Maathu, Sukumari, Jagadish, Murali and Jagannatha Varma.

Plot
Vishnu is a rich businessman, happily married to innocent Seetha. Vishnu is a flirt and always interested in having affairs with multiple partners. However, most of his plans were unsuccessful. He pretends to love Ragini and assures her to marry her. But his intentions are different. He starts having affair with a young and beautiful Revathi. He also gets infatuated by the newly appointed steno Rose Mary at his office. But every time, he fails to reach his target. He is so lascivious and a womanizer who even gets attracted to a teenage girl. The situation gets worsened after he joins team with Thomas Chacko and Nair. Nair introduces Vishnu to a new girl Indhu, who is an orphan. Indu is childlike and innocent and she blindly believes Murali. She went off with Vishnu to his house. Vishnu, eagerly waiting for sexual intercourse, gets distracted and disappointed by Indhu's genuine nature. The climax is reached when Vishnu's mother, Malathi and her father arrive at Vishnu's bungalow. Vishnu manages to make his family believe that Indhu is his illegitimate daughter. But he had to face the dangerous consequences that awaited him. Vishnu's family accepted Indhu as his daughter and took her to the ancestral home. Vishnu is completely bewildered and disappointed as he needs to return Indhu to Murali. Vishnu changes his mind and determines not to give Indhu back to them. The rest of the story deals with the complex situations.

Cast
 Mammootty as Vishnu Narayanan/Kuttetan
 Saritha as Seetha Lakshmi, Vishnu's wife 
 Maathu as Indhu
 Lizy as Revathy
 Urvashi as Rosemary
 Syama as Ragini
 Suma Jayaram as Jaya
 Suchitra as Nurse, cameo appearance 
 Sukumari as Vishnu's Mother
 Jagadish as Gopalakrishnan
 Oduvil Unnikrishnan as Nanu Nair
 Murali as Nair
 Thilakan as Thomas Chacko 
 Jagannatha Varma as Narayanan Menon, Vishnu's father-in-law 
 Babu Namboothiri as Vishnu's friend
 Valsala Menon as Hostel Matron
 Renuka as Thomas Chacko's girlfriend

Release
The film was released on 29 September 1990. The film was both commercial and critical success.

References

External links
 

1990s Malayalam-language films
Films with screenplays by A. K. Lohithadas
Films scored by Raveendran
Films scored by S. P. Venkatesh
Films directed by Joshiy